Pracha Chuen Road is a road in Bangkok and its neighbouring Nonthaburi. It is also the name of the surrounding its location.

Pracha Chuen is a road runs along Khlong Prapa (water supply canal) west side all the length.  It separates itself from Pracharat Sai 2 Road near Tao Pun area in Bang Sue side on the border of Chatuchak. Then it northward, intersecting with various roads up until terminating at Si Saman Road (which leaded to Office of the Permanent Secretary for Defence) in the area of Pak Kret district, Nonthaburi.

Pracha Chuen is a road connects two main thoroughfares, Chaeng Watthana (Highway 304) and Ratchadaphisek (Inner Ring Road). It is also the location of many residences and important places as well as utilities nearby were Tesco Lotus Pracha Chuen, Bang Sue District Office, Pracha Chuen Metropolitan Waterwork Authority, Kasemrad Prachachuen Hospital, Bang Son railway station and Bang Son MRT Station (PP15), Wat Samian Nari temple, Bon Marché Market Park, Matichon Headquarters, Dhurakij Pundit University (DPU), including recommended restaurants by Michelin Guide.

The road is also served pocket parks in roadside park form. One of them at the end of 2019 was used a venue for the launch of Rosana Tositrakul, an independent candidate for the Bangkok governor's election in 2022.

The popular night bazaar, JJ Green 2 moved from its original location on Kamphaeng Phet 3 Road near Chatuchak and Vachirabenjatas Parks to here in 2020 due to the expiration of the land lease agreement two years earlier.

Pracha Chuen area was once home to Technology Prachachuen School, a vocational institution that was established in 1980, upgraded from a kindergarten. It has now changed its status to a commercial school in the name of Varatip Business Technology College (V-Tech) since 2002.

References

Streets in Bangkok
Bang Sue district
Roads in Thailand
Neighbourhoods of Bangkok
Neighbourhoods in Thailand